Stephanie Mary Proud (born 29 August 1988) is an English competitive swimmer who has represented Great Britain at the Olympics, and England in the Commonwealth Games.

As a member of the British team at the 2012 Summer Olympics in London, Proud competed in the women's 200-metre backstroke event.  She advanced to the 200-metre event semifinals, and came ninth overall, with a time of 2:09.04.

Personal bests and records held

References

1988 births
Living people
English backstroke swimmers
Florida Gators women's swimmers
Olympic swimmers of Great Britain
Swimmers at the 2010 Commonwealth Games
Swimmers at the 2012 Summer Olympics
English female swimmers
Universiade medalists in swimming
Universiade gold medalists for Great Britain
Medalists at the 2009 Summer Universiade
Commonwealth Games competitors for England